Puya alba is a species in the genus Puya. This species is endemic to Bolivia.

References

alba
Flora of Bolivia